Enugu North senatorial District in Enugu State is made up of six local government areas of Igbo-Etiti, Igboeze North, Igboeze South, Nsukka, Udenu and Uzo-Uwani.

List of senators representing Enugu North

References 

Enugu State
Senatorial districts in Nigeria